This is a list of rivers and streams of the United States Virgin Islands (U.S. territory), grouped by island.

Saint Croix
Salt River

Saint John
From east to west, all flowing to the south coast:

Carolina Gut
Cob Gut
Lameshur Bay Gut
Reef Bay Gut
Living Gut (Rustenberg Gut)
Mollendal Gut
Fish Bay Gut
Battery Gut
Guinea Gut

Saint Thomas
Turpentine Run

References

External links
 GEOnet Names Server

Rivers
+United States Virgin Islands
U
Virgin Islands